Laneville may mean:
Laneville, Hale County, Alabama
Laneville, Lowndes County, Alabama
Laneville, Texas
Laneville High School
Laneville Independent School District
Laneville, West Virginia
Laneville, Wisconsin